This list is a chronological progression of record times for the marathon. World records in the marathon are now ratified by World Athletics, the international governing body for the sport of athletics.

Kenyan Eliud Kipchoge set a world record for men of 2:01:09 on September 25, 2022, at the 2022 Berlin Marathon. This run improved on his own previous world record by 30 seconds. In 2018, he broke the then world record by 1 minute and 18 seconds, the greatest improvement over a previous record since 1967.

The IAAF recognizes two world records for women, a time of 2:14:04 set by Brigid Kosgei on October 13, 2019, during the Chicago Marathon, which was contested by men and women together, and a "Women Only" record of 2:17:01, set by Mary Keitany, on April 23, 2017, at the London Marathon for women only.

Criteria for record eligibility

The criteria include:
 "The start and finish points of a course, measured along a theoretical straight line between them, shall not be further apart than 50% of the race distance."
 "The decrease in elevation between the start and finish shall not exceed an average of one in a thousand, i.e. 1m per km."

In recognizing Kenyan Geoffrey Mutai's mark of 2:03:02 at the 2011 Boston Marathon as (at the time) "the fastest Marathon ever run", the IAAF said: "Due to the elevation drop and point-to-point measurements of the Boston course, performances [on that course] are not eligible for World record consideration."

Road racing events like the marathon were specifically excepted from IAAF rule 260 18(d) that rejected from consideration those track and field performances set in mixed competition.

The Association of Road Racing Statisticians, an independent organization that compiles data from road running events, also maintains an alternate marathon world best progression but with standards they consider to be more stringent.

Women's world record
The IAAF Congress at 2011 World Championships in Athletics passed a motion changing the record eligibility criteria effective October 6th 2007, so that women's world records must be set in all-women competitions. The result of the change was that Radcliffe's 2:17:42 performance at the 2005 London Marathon would supplant her own existing women's mark as the "world record"; the earlier performance was to be referred to as a "world best". The decision was met with strong protest in Britain, and in November 2011 an IAAF council member reported that Radcliffe's original mark would be allowed to stand, with the eventual decision that both marks would be recognized as "world records," the faster one as a "Mixed Gender" mark, the other as a "Women Only" mark. Per the 2021 IAAF Competition Rules, "a World Record for performance achieved in mixed gender (“Mixed”) races and a World Record for performance achieved in single gender (“Women only”) races" is tracked separately.

Unofficial record attempts
In December 2016, Nike, Inc., announced that three top distance runners — Eliud Kipchoge, Zersenay Tadese and Lelisa Desisa — had agreed to forgo the spring marathon season to work with the company in an effort to run a sub-two-hour marathon, though a detailed plan to complete the marathon in 1:59:59 or faster was not released.

The Breaking2 event took place in the early morning of May 6, 2017; Kipchoge crossed the finish line with a time of 2:00:25. This time was more than two minutes faster than the world record. Among other factors, specialized pacers were used, entering the race midway to help Kipchoge keep up the pace.

Kipchoge took part in a similar attempt to break the two-hour barrier in Vienna on October 12, 2019, as part of the Ineos 1:59 Challenge. He successfully ran the first sub two-hour marathon distance, with a time of 1:59:40.2. The effort did not count as a new world record under IAAF rules due to the setup of the challenge. Specifically, it was not an open event, Kipchoge was handed fluids by his support team throughout, the run featured a pace car, and included rotating teams of other runners pacing Kipchoge in a formation designed to reduce wind resistance and maximize efficiency. The achievement was recognized by Guinness World Records with the titles ‘Fastest marathon distance (male)’ and ‘First marathon distance run under two hours’.

History
Marathon races were first held in 1896, but the distance was not standardized by the International Association of Athletics Federations (IAAF) until 1921. The actual distance for pre-1921 races frequently varied slightly from the present figure of 42.195 km (26 miles 385 yards). In qualifying races for the 1896 Summer Olympics, Greek runners Charilaos Vasilakos (3:18:00) and Ioannis Lavrentis (3:11:27) won the first two modern marathons. On April 10, 1896, Spiridon Louis of Greece won the first Olympic marathon in Athens, Greece, in a time of 2:58:50; however, the distance for the event was reported to be only 40,000 meters. Three months later, British runner Len Hurst won the inaugural Paris to Conflans Marathon (also around 40 km) in a time of 2:31:30. In 1900, Hurst would better his time on the same course with a 2:26:28 performance. Later, Shizo Kanakuri of Japan was reported to have set a world record of 2:32:45 in a November 1911 domestic qualification race for the 1912 Summer Olympics, but this performance was also run over a distance of approximately 40 km. The first marathon over the now official distance was won by American Johnny Hayes at the 1908 Summer Olympics, with a time of 2:55:18.4.

It is possible that Stamata Revithi, who ran the 1896 Olympic course a day after Louis, is the first woman to run the modern marathon; she is said to have finished in 5½ hours. The IAAF credits Violet Piercy's 1926 performance as the first woman to race what is now the standard marathon distance; however, other sources report that the 1918 performance of Marie-Louise Ledru in the Tour de Paris set the initial mark for women. Other "unofficial" performances have also been reported to be world bests or world records over time. Although her performance is not recognized by the IAAF, Adrienne Beames from Australia is frequently credited as the first woman to break the 3-hour barrier in the marathon.

In the 1953 Boston Marathon, the top three male finishers were thought to have broken the standing world record, but Keizo Yamada's mark of 2:18:51 is now considered to have been set on a short course. The Boston Athletic Association does not report Yamada's performance as a world best. On October 25, 1981, American Alberto Salazar and New Zealander Allison Roe set apparent world bests at the New York City Marathon (2:08:13 and 2:25:29); however, these marks were invalidated when the course was later found to have been nearly 150 meters short. Although the IAAF's progression notes three performances set on the same course in 1978, 1979, and 1980 by Norwegian Grete Waitz, the Association of Road Racing Statisticians considers the New York City course suspect for those performances, too.

On April 18, 2011, the Boston Marathon produced what were at that time the two fastest marathon performances of all time. Winner Geoffrey Mutai of Kenya recorded a time of 2:03:02, followed by countryman Moses Mosop in 2:03:06. However, since the Boston course does not meet the criteria for record attempts, these times were not ratified by the IAAF.

Eight IAAF world records have been set at the Polytechnic Marathon (1909, 1913, 1952–54, 1963–65). IAAF world records have been broken at all of the original five World Marathon Majors on numerous occasions (updated 09/2022); twelve times at the Berlin Marathon, three times at the Boston Marathon, five times at the Chicago Marathon, six times at the London Marathon, and five times at the New York City Marathon. However, the records established in the Boston event have been disputed on grounds of a downhill point-to-point course, while four of the five New York records have been disputed on grounds of a short course.

Men

Table key:
The edition of the marathon is linked on some of the dates.

Women

Table key:

Gallery of world record holders

See also

 Marathon year rankings
 National records in the marathon

Men's Masters Records
 Masters M35 marathon world record progression
 Masters M40 marathon world record progression
 Masters M45 marathon world record progression
 Masters M50 marathon world record progression
 Masters M55 marathon world record progression
 Masters M60 marathon world record progression
 Masters M65 marathon world record progression
 Masters M70 marathon world record progression
 Masters M75 marathon world record progression
 Masters M80 marathon world record progression
 Masters M85 marathon world record progression
 Masters M90 marathon world record progression
 Masters M100 marathon world record progression

Women's Masters Records
 Masters W35 marathon world record progression
 Masters W40 marathon world record progression
 Masters W45 marathon world record progression
 Masters W50 marathon world record progression
 Masters W55 marathon world record progression
 Masters W60 marathon world record progression
 Masters W65 marathon world record progression
 Masters W70 marathon world record progression
 Masters W75 marathon world record progression
 Masters W80 marathon world record progression
 Masters W85 marathon world record progression
 Masters W90 marathon world record progression

Notes

References

Sources

External links
13th IAAF World Championships in Athletics – IAAF Statistics Handbook – Daegu 2011 (all 5 parts)
Runner's World  What Will It Take to Run A 2-Hour Marathon?
BBC – “Could a marathon ever be run in under two hours?”
Interactive graph of men's and women's marathon times with race descriptions (outdated)

Marathon